Lagosanto is a comune (municipality) in the Province of Ferrara in the Italian region Emilia-Romagna, located about  northeast of Bologna and about  east of Ferrara.

Lagosanto borders the following municipalities: Codigoro, Comacchio, Fiscaglia, Ostellato.

People
Fulvio Mingozzi (1925-2000), actor

References

External links

 Official website

Cities and towns in Emilia-Romagna